Vivien Jackl (born 17 October 2008) is a Hungarian competitive swimmer. She is a 2022 European Junior Championships bronze medalist in the 400-metre individual medley and semi-finalist in the 200-metre backstroke and 200-metre butterfly. At the 2022 World Junior Championships, she placed sixth in the finals of the 200-metre butterfly and the 400-metre individual medley and seventh in the final of the 1500-metre freestyle.

Background
Jackl was born 17 October 2008 in Budapest, Hungary, and competes for swim club Tatabányai Vízmű.

Career

2021–2022: European junior medalist at 13 years of age
In June 2021, 12-year-old Jackl set a Hungarian age group record at the 2021 Hungarian National Youth Championships in Kaposvár with a time of 4:46.47 in the 400-metre individual medley, breaking the former mark set by Krisztina Egerszegi in 1987. While her time was fast enough for the 2021 European Junior Swimming Championships, she was ineligible to compete as she was too young, she was 13 years of age at the end of the calendar year and competition had a minimum age of 14 years of age for female competitors.

2022 European Junior Championships
She also placed ninth in the semifinals of the 200-metre butterfly with a personal best time of 2:15.18, twelfth in the 400-metre freestyle in 4:20.86, thirteenth in the semifinals of the 200-metre backstroke with a time of 2:17.62, and 29th in the 200-metre individual medley with a 2:24.56.

2022 World Junior Championships
Jackl entered to compete in at the 2022 FINA World Junior Swimming Championships, held starting 30 August in Lima, Peru, along with fourteen other Hungarian swimmers. Leading up to the Championships, she was highlighted by SwimSwam for one of the top five storylines to follow in girls's competition, specifically who would make the podium in the 400-metre individual medley. On the first day of competition, she ranked sixth in the preliminary heats of the 400-metre individual medley with a 4:51.48, qualifying for the evening final. In the final, she placed sixth with a time of 4:52.23, finishing less than 15 seconds behind gold medalist Mio Narita of Japan. In the morning on day two, she was the only Hungarian to compete in the preliminaries of the 200-metre butterfly and qualified for the final ranking seventh with a time of 2:17.80. She improved her time to a 2:16.16 in the final and placed sixth. The third day, she neared her personal best time in the preliminaries of the 200-metre backstroke with a time of 2:17.97 and placed tenth. Finishing in a time of 17:03.15 in the final of the 1500-metre freestyle on the fifth day, she placed seventh in the event.

In December, and less than two months after she turned fourteen years old, Jackl achieved a personal best time of 2:14.25 in the 200-metre butterfly at the 2022 Central European Countries Junior Meet in Prague, Czech Republic, finishing 0.10 seconds behind the first-place finisher and winning the silver medal.

International championships (50 m)

Personal best times

Long course meters (50 m pool)

References

External links
 

2008 births
Living people
Swimmers from Budapest
Hungarian female backstroke swimmers
Hungarian female medley swimmers
21st-century Hungarian women
Hungarian female freestyle swimmers